Veljko Simić (born 17 February 1995) is a Serbian professional footballer who plays for Vojvodina as an attacking midfielder.

Club career

Early career
A product of the Red Star Belgrade, Simić and Filip Janković were considered the two most talented players from Red Star's youth team of players born in 1995. However, he never transitioned into the first team, and instead signed a professional contract with Basel in 2014. Technical problems made him ineligible and was consequently loaned to Slovenian outfit Domžale. He made his first team debut against Radomlje where he started the match only to be substituted off in the 70th minute.

On 7 January 2016, he joined Schaffhausen on loan until the end of the 2015-16 season. For the season 2016-17 he was loaned to Chiasso. On 1 September 2017 Basel announced that the contract with Simić had been dissolved by mutual consent.

Simić joined Serbian side Zemun as a free agent during the 2017–18 winter transfer window. In his last game for Zemun, he scored a last-minute goal in a 1–1 tie against Vojvodina on July 28, 2018.

Red Star Belgrade
Simić signed a four-year contract with Red Star Belgrade in the summer of 2018. In a promotional event, he told journalists that his early departure from Red Star to Basel had been "a mistake from which young players can learn". His contract was terminated after two and a half seasons on 11 January 2021.

Vojvodina
Simic signed a two and a half year contract with Vojvodina on 13 January 2021.

International career
Simić debuted for Serbia on 25 January 2023 in a friendly match against United States which Serbia won 2–1. Simić scored the second Serbian goal of the match and his first goal on international level.

Career statistics

International

Scores and results list the Serbia's goal tally first, score column indicates score after each Simić's goal.

Honours
Red Star Belgrade
Serbian SuperLiga: 2018–19, 2019–20

References

External links 
 

 

1995 births
Living people
Association football midfielders
Serbian footballers
FC Basel players
NK Domžale players
FC Schaffhausen players
Serbia youth international footballers
Serbian expatriate footballers
Expatriate footballers in Switzerland
Serbian SuperLiga players
FK Zemun players
Red Star Belgrade footballers
Serbian expatriate sportspeople in Switzerland
FC Winterthur players
Swiss Challenge League players
Expatriate footballers in Slovenia
Serbian expatriate sportspeople in Slovenia
Slovenian PrvaLiga players
Footballers from Belgrade
Serbia international footballers